Colorado's 18th Senate district is one of 35 districts in the Colorado Senate. It has been represented by Democrat Steve Fenberg, the current Senate President, since 2017.

Geography
District 18 is based in the city of Boulder, also covering the outlying Boulder County communities of Lyons, Nederland, Gunbarrel, and Niwot.

The district is located almost entirely within Colorado's 2nd congressional district, with a small section extending into the 4th district. It overlaps with the 10th, 11th, 12th, and 13th districts of the Colorado House of Representatives.

Recent election results
Colorado state senators are elected to staggered four-year terms; under normal circumstances, the 18th district holds elections in presidential years.

2020

2016

2012

Federal and statewide results in District 18

References 

18
Boulder County, Colorado